The Château du Grand Verdus is a manor house in Sadirac, Gironde, Aquitaine, France.

The château was built in the 16th century.

Architectural significance
It has been listed as an official monument since 1978.

References

Châteaux in Gironde
Monuments historiques of Gironde